Kelsey Bevan (married name Campbell, born 10 April 1990) is a New Zealand representative rower. She is an Olympian and a 2019 world champion winning the women's eight title at the 2019 World Rowing Championships.

Bevan was born in 1990. She received her education at Manurewa High School.

Bevan is a member of the Counties Manukau Rowing Club, and she started rowing there while at Manurewa High School. She won the gold medal in the coxless four at the 2014 World Rowing Championships in Amsterdam. With the women's eight, she came fourth at the 2016 Rio Olympics.

References

External links
 

1990 births
Living people
New Zealand female rowers
Rowers from Auckland
World Rowing Championships medalists for New Zealand
Rowers at the 2016 Summer Olympics
Olympic rowers of New Zealand
People educated at Manurewa High School
Rowers at the 2020 Summer Olympics
Medalists at the 2020 Summer Olympics
Olympic silver medalists for New Zealand
Olympic medalists in rowing
21st-century New Zealand women